Anisoscelis gradadius is a species of leaf-footed bug in the family Coreidae. It occurs in Central America and has been observed in Guatemala, Costa Rica, and Panama. It was first described by British entomologist William Lucas Distant in 1881.

References 

Insects described in 1881
gradadius